Estonian Disc Golf Association (abbreviation EDGA) is one of the sport governing bodies in Estonia which deals with disc golf.

EDGA is established in 2014. EDGA is a member of Estonian Olympic Committee.

References

External links
 

Sports governing bodies in Estonia